Andrés Rivero Agüero (4 February 1905 – 8 November 1996) was a Cuban politician who served as the 12th Prime Minister of Cuba and was elected president of Cuba in the 1958 Cuban presidential election.

Early life 
Rivero was born to extremely poor parents in San Luis, Oriente Province (now Santiago de Cuba Province) on 4 February 1905. He taught himself to read when he was 16. Rivero managed to secure a high school education by his own efforts, and obtained a law degree from Havana University (1934).  Elected a city councilman in Santiago de Cuba, he quickly became a leader of the Liberal Party, and was befriended by Fulgencio Batista. During Batista's first administration (1940–1944), Rivero served as Minister of Agriculture, and implemented Batista's plan for resettling landless peasants in Oriente Province.

During General Batista's exile in the United States from 1944–1952, Rivero practised law in Cuba and wrote political commentary for several periodicals. When Batista returned to run for President of Cuba in 1952, Rivero helped to organise Batista's United Action Party.  He supported Batista's military coup on 10 March 1952, and thereafter served as Minister of Education in Batista's second administration (1952–1958).  Elected a Senator from Pinar del Río province in 1954, Rivero became Cuba's prime minister (1957–1958), and participated in several reconciliation conferences as Batista's representative.

Rivero resigned his premiership in 1958 to run for President of Cuba. He received the support of Batista's Progressive Action Party, and three other pro-government parties. Rivero was declared the winner of the elections, which were speculated by many to have been rigged with the support of the United States government in an effort to repel the ongoing Cuban revolution. After the election, Rivero entered into conversations with U.S. Ambassador Earl E. T. Smith, and with leading Cuban politicians, to resolve the crisis caused by the ongoing rebellion led by Fidel Castro.  He apparently wished to convene a Constituent Assembly shortly after taking office, to bring about a restoration of constitutional rule.  However, the success of the revolution frustrated Rivero's plans, and he fled with General Batista into exile in the Dominican Republic on 1 January 1959.

Rivero eventually settled in the United States, living in extremely modest circumstances. He lived to be a great-grandfather.  Rivero died in Miami, Florida in 1996.

References

External links
Despatch From the US Embassy in Cuba to the US Department of State 1958 Elections: Electoral Outlook Six Weeks Prior to Elections

Cuban senators
Prime Ministers of Cuba
1905 births
1996 deaths
Liberal Party of Cuba politicians
People from Santiago de Cuba Province
Cuban people of Spanish descent
People of the Cuban Revolution
1950s in Cuba
20th-century Cuban lawyers
20th-century Cuban politicians
Grand Crosses 1st class of the Order of Merit of the Federal Republic of Germany